Safe Sex is a 1999 Greek comedy film written and directed by Michalis Reppas and Thanasis Papathanasiou.  When the film was released in Greece, it was considered a blockbuster.

Plot
The film features an ensemble cast of Greek actors portraying various characters, each living his own story in modern Greece. Almost everyone of the protagonists is interrelated to each other, and all live their own parallel stories which often converge at several points. Several professional actors appear briefly or in non-speaking cameo roles.

As a result, there is no central plot or prominent protagonist who may be singled out. The major theme of the movie is sex and each character's approach to it, portrayed in a comedic way.

Cast
Anna Panayiotopoulou as Rena Drouga
Mina Adamaki as Chloe
Alexandros Antonopoulos as Apostolos Drougas
Vaso Goulielmaki as Vivy
Haris Grigoropoulos as Anestis
Renia Louizidou as Anna
Spiros Papadopoulos as Fedon
Evelina Papoulia as Mary
Tasos Halkias as Antonis
Viki Koulianou as Veronica
Arietta Moutousi as Kaiti
Pavlos Haikalis as Kostas
Ieroklis Michailidis as Vardousis
Sperantza Vrana as Roberta
Andreas Voutsinas as Audition Director
Tzimis Panousis as Priest

References

External links

1999 films
Greek comedy films
1990s Greek-language films
Greek LGBT-related films
1999 comedy films
1999 LGBT-related films
Films shot in Athens
LGBT-related comedy films